The 2008 XL Bermuda Open singles was a tennis competition event of the Association of Tennis Professionals (ATP), the secondary professional tennis circuit organized by the ATP. The 2008 ATP series calendar comprised 176 tournaments, with prize money ranging from $25,000 up to $150,000.

In the 2008 XL Bermuda Open Mariano Zabaleta was the defending champion.

Seeds

Draws

Finals

Section 1

Section 2

References

Singles
2008 ATP Challenger Series